Neave Island ("Isle of the Saint") or Coomb(e) Island is an island on the north coast of the Scottish mainland.

Neave Island is a small rugged island to the east of Eilean nan Ròn in Sutherland, separated from the mainland by a narrow channel, Caol Beag. There are remains of an ancient church, identified as St. Coloumba's Church on an 1874 map of the island.

Footnotes

Islands of Sutherland
Uninhabited islands of Highland (council area)